Austin Independent School District (AISD) is a school district based in the city of Austin, Texas, United States. Established in 1881, the district serves most of the City of Austin, the neighboring municipalities of Sunset Valley and San Leanna, and unincorporated areas in Travis County (including Manchaca). The district operates 125 schools including 78 elementary schools, 19 middle schools, and 17 high schools. , AISD covers 54.1% of the City of Austin.

Academic achievement
In 2018-19, the school district was rated a B by the Texas Education Agency (TEA.) No state accountability ratings were given to districts for the 2019-20 and 2020-21 school years. Prior to the 2011-12 school year, school districts in Texas could receive one of four possible rankings from the Texas Education Agency: Exemplary (the highest possible ranking), Recognized, Academically Acceptable, and Academically Unacceptable (the lowest possible ranking). For the 2012-13 school year, the TEA moved to a Pass/Fail system. In 2017, the TEA adopted an A-F accountability system.

Finances
Like other Texas public school districts, AISD is funded through a combination of local property taxes, general state revenues (such as occupation taxes, Texas Lottery profits, and returns from the Permanent School Fund), and federal education funds. The district also funds some facilities construction and improvements through the issuance of debt by bond elections; AISD's most recent bond election was in 2017.

List of superintendents

John B. Winn – 1881–1894
Prof. Thomas Green Harris – 1895–1903
Arthur N. McCallum Sr. – 1903–1942
Dr. Russell Lewis – 1942–1947
Dr. J.W. Edgar – 1947–1950
Dr. Irby B. Carruth – 1950–1970
Dr. Jack L. Davidson – 1970–1980
Dr. John Ellis – 1980–1990
Dr. Gonzalo Garza (Interim) – 1990–1991
Dr. Jim B. Hensley – 1991–1992
Dr. Terry N. Bishop (Interim) – 1993–1994
Dr. James Fox Jr. – 1995–1998
A.C. Gonzalez (Interim) – 1998–1999
Dr. Pascal D. Forgione Jr. – 1999–2009
Dr. Meria Carstarphen – 2009–2014
Dr. Paul Cruz – 2014–2020
Dr. Stephanie S. Elizalde – 2020–2022
Dr. Anthony Mays (Interim) – 2022
Matias Segura (Interim) - 2023-Present

Demographics

In the 1970s white flight to Westlake and other suburbs of Austin that were majority white began. In 1970 the student body of AISD was 65% non-Hispanic (Anglo) white. In the late 1970s the student body was 57% non-Hispanic white, 26% Hispanic and Latino, and 15% African-American. Until 1978 AISD categorized Hispanics and Latinos as "white" so they could integrate them with African-Americans while leaving non-Hispanic whites out of integration. That year it was forced to integrate Hispanics and non-Hispanic whites. In 2000 the student body of AISD was 37% non-Hispanic white. The Hispanic student population peaked in 2011, at 52,398 students. As of the 2016-17 school year, there are 48,386 Hispanic students, 22,761 non-Hispanic white students, and 6,578 African-American students.

On November 18, 2019 the AISD board of Trustees voted 6-3 in favor of a plan closing four elementary schools. This vote was criticized by many, including AISD Chief Equity Officer, Dr. Hawley who stated that the "map that you have of the closures is a map of what 21st century racism looks like. ... Our process for selecting schools was flawed. It was inequitable." The six Trustees who voted to close the schools were Cindy Anderson, Amber Elenz, Geronimo Rodriguez, Jayme Mathias, Yasmin Wagner and Kristen Ashy.

High schools

The following high schools cover grades 9 to 12, unless otherwise noted.

Zoned high schools

Unzoned high schools 
The Ann Richards School, Garza Independence High School, and LASA have independent campuses, but International High School shares a campus with Northeast Early College High School.

Other high school programs 
The Graduation Preparatory Academies at Navarro and Travis Early College High Schools are officially listed as separate schools from their home campuses, but they are housed within the same building and share many programs.

Middle schools

Zoned middle schools

Other middle school programs 
The Kealing and Lively magnet programs accept students from across AISD on a basis of academic record and provide them with a more advanced program. The magnet programs are housed in their respective schools, but provide some different classes to their students.

Elementary schools

 Allison Elementary School
 Andrews Elementary School
 Baldwin Elementary School
 Baranoff Elementary School
 Barbara Jordan Elementary School
 Barrington Elementary School
 Barton Hills Elementary School
 Bear Creek Elementary School
 Becker Elementary School
 Blackshear Elementary School (1891)
 Blanton Elementary School
National Blue Ribbon School in 2000–01
 Blazier Elementary School
 Boone Elementary School
 Brentwood Elementary School
 Bryker Woods Elementary School
 Campbell Elementary School
 Casey Elementary School
 Casis Elementary School
 Clayton Elementary School
 Cook Elementary School
 Cowan Elementary School
 Cunningham Elementary School
 Davis Elementary School
 Dawson Elementary School
 Doss Elementary School
 Galindo Elementary School

 Govalle Elementary School
 Graham Elementary School
 Guerrero Thompson Elementary School
 Gullett Elementary School
 Harris Elementary School
 Hart Elementary School
 Highland Park Elementary School
National Blue Ribbon School in 1991–92 and 2006 
 Hill Elementary School
National Blue Ribbon School in 1993–94
 Houston Elementary School
 Joslin Elementary School
 Kiker Elementary School
 Kocurek Elementary School
 Langford Elementary School
 Lee Elementary School
National Blue Ribbon School in 1991–92

 Linder Elementary School
 Maplewood Elementary School
 Mathews Elementary School (1916)
 McBee Elementary School
 Menchaca Elementary School (1884)

 Mills Elementary School
 Norman-Sims Elementary School
 Oak Hill Elementary School
 Oak Springs Elementary School
 Odom Elementary School
 Ortega Elementary School
National Blue Ribbon School in 1993–94
 Overton Elementary School

 Padron Elementary School
 Palm Elementary School
 Patton Elementary School
 Pecan Springs Elementary School
 Perez Elementary School 
 Pickle Elementary School
 Pillow Elementary School
2004 National Blue Ribbon School
 Pleasant Hill Elementary School
 Reilly Elementary School
 Ridgetop Elementary School
 Rodriguez Elementary School
 Sanchez Elementary School
 St. Elmo Elementary School (1914)
 Summitt Elementary School
 Sunset Valley Elementary School (Sunset Valley)
 T. A. Brown Elementary School
National Blue Ribbon School in 1996–97
 Travis Heights Elementary School (1939)
 Uphaus Early Childhood Center
 Walnut Creek Elementary School
National Blue Ribbon School in 1996–97
 Widen Elementary School
 Williams Elementary School
 Winn Elementary School
 Wooldridge Elementary School
 Wooten Elementary School
 Zavala Elementary School
National Blue Ribbon School in 1996–97
 Zilker Elementary School
National Blue Ribbon School in 1998–99

Mathews Elementary School opened circa 1916.. In 2007 there were about 400 students, from over 40 countries, with 125 from the UT complexes. Many children of the UT Austin students living at Brackenridge and Colorado apartments attend Mathews Elementary. School buses come to Brackenridge to pick up students to go to Mathews. The school is considered by the area community to be high achieving. Mathews has a racially/ethnically diverse student body. The school offers Chinese language classes.

Athletic facilities

Toney Burger Center (Football, Baseball, Track and field, Basketball, Volleyball, Soccer)
I.I. Nelson Field (Football, Baseball, Track & Field, Soccer)
Delco Activity Center (Basketball, Volleyball)
Ellie Noack Sports Complex (Baseball, Softball, Football, Soccer)
House Park (Football, Soccer)

Gallery

See also

List of school districts in Texas
List of high schools in Texas

References

Further reading
McGee, Kate. "Black Students Are Eight Percent of AISD – and Nearly One-Fourth of Suspensions" (Archive). KUT. Monday May 19, 2014.

External links

 

 
School districts in Travis County, Texas
Education in Austin, Texas
1881 establishments in Texas
School districts established in 1881